The LEN Europa Cup is a new  event for national water polo teams organized by LEN.

Competition format 
The competition format consists of two phases: Preliminary and Super Final, each stage being held over a weekend.

Results

Men's

Women's

Medal table

Men's

Women's

References

External links 
men 2018
women 2018

 
International water polo competitions
LEN water polo competitions
Recurring sporting events established in 2018
2018 establishments in Europe